Grays Creek is a  long 2nd order tributary to the Yadkin River in Wilkes County, North Carolina.

Course
Grays Creek rises about 0.5 miles northeast of Dark Mountain and then flows northerly to join the Yadkin River at about 1 mile southwest of Ronda, North Carolina.

Watershed
Grays Creek drains  of area, receives about 49.9 in/year of precipitation, has a wetness index of 355.77, and is about 48% forested.

References

Rivers of North Carolina
Rivers of Wilkes County, North Carolina